The 2014 African U-20 Women's World Cup Qualifying Tournament was the 7th edition of the African U-20 Women's World Cup Qualifying Tournament, the biennial international youth football competition organised by the Confederation of African Football (CAF) to determine which women's under-20 national teams from Africa qualify for the FIFA U-20 Women's World Cup.

The tournament was  played on a home and away knockout basis between September 2013 and 24 January 2014. 17 teams entered the competition, although Egypt withdrew before playing a match.
The top two teams of the tournament Ghana and Nigeria qualified for the 2014 FIFA U-20 Women's World Cup in Canada as the CAF representatives.

Participants
The Confederation of African Football invited all national teams, needing confirmation of participation by 14 July 2013. Eventually 17 teams entered the competition.

Preliminary round
Uganda's 13–0 return leg win was a tournament record for the African qualifiers.

|}

Uganda won 22−0 on aggregate and advanced to the first round.

First round
Nigeria was drawn to play Burkina Faso this round, but after Burkina Faso withdrew they were paired against Sierra Leone.

|}

1: Egypt withdrew from their match against Uganda.
2: Guinea-Bissau withdrew from their match against Ghana.

Second round
Played on weekends of 6 and 20 December 2013.

|}
1: Uganda withdrew from their match against Ghana for financial reasons.

Third round
Played on weekends of 10 and 24 January 2014. Nigeria qualified for the seventh time in as many attempts. Ghana qualifies for the third time in a row.

|}

Qualified teams for FIFA U-20 Women's World Cup
The following two teams from CAF qualified for the FIFA U-20 Women's World Cup.

References

External links
 Official schedule and results
 Results and schedule at futbol24.com

African U-20 Women's World Cup qualification
CAF
Wom
2014 in youth association football